"Trap Back Jumpin" is a song by American rapper T.I. It was released November 13, 2012 as the third official single from his eighth studio album Trouble Man: Heavy Is the Head (2012).

Release
The song was leaked on September 14, 2012 before T.I. performed it at the BET Hip Hop Awards. The single was available for digital download on November 13, 2012.

Music video
The music video was directed by Clifton Bell and was released on December 11, 2012.

Charts

References

2012 songs
T.I. songs
Songs written by T.I.
Song recordings produced by DJ Toomp
Grand Hustle Records singles
Atlantic Records singles
Songs written by DJ Toomp